Anshuman Singh (born 28 September 1999) is an Indian cricketer. He made his List A debut for Jammu and Kashmir in the 2016–17 Vijay Hazare Trophy on 6 March 2017.

References

External links
 

1999 births
Living people
Indian cricketers
Jammu and Kashmir cricketers
Place of birth missing (living people)